The 1960 Cleveland Indians season was a season in American baseball. It involved the Indians' fourth-place finish in the American League with a record of 76 wins and 78 losses, 21 games behind the AL Champion New York Yankees. This season was notable for the infamous trade of Rocky Colavito.

Offseason 
 December 6, 1959: Minnie Miñoso, Dick Brown, Don Ferrarese, and Jake Striker were traded by the Indians to the Chicago White Sox for Johnny Romano, Bubba Phillips, and Norm Cash.
 December 15, 1959: Billy Martin, Gordy Coleman and Cal McLish were traded by the Cleveland Indians to the Reds for Johnny Temple.
 Prior to 1960 season: Jim King was obtained by the Indians from the Toronto Maple Leafs as part of a minor league working agreement.

Regular season

Season standings

Record vs. opponents

Notable transactions 
 April 3, 1960: Al Cicotte was purchased by the Toronto Maple Leafs from the Indians.
 April 12, 1960: Norm Cash was traded by the Indians to the Detroit Tigers for Steve Demeter.
 April 17, 1960: 1959 AL home run king Rocky Colavito was traded by the Indians to the Detroit Tigers for 1959 AL batting champion Harvey Kuenn.
 April 18, 1960: Herb Score was traded by the Indians to the Chicago White Sox for Barry Latman.
 June 11, 1960: Paul Casanova was released by the Indians.
 June 13, 1960: Russ Nixon and Carroll Hardy were traded by the Indians to the Boston Red Sox for Marty Keough and Ted Bowsfield. It was he second time the Indians traded Nixon to the Red Sox in three months: a March 16 deal sent Nixon to Boston for fellow catcher Sammy White, but White retired rather than report to Cleveland and the trade was nullified March 25.
 August 3, 1960: In what was termed the first (and up to the present day, only) "trade" of managers in baseball history, Cleveland and Detroit exchanged Joe Gordon for Jimmy Dykes. In the days that followed, the two teams also "traded" coaches, as the Indians' Jo-Jo White and the Tigers' Luke Appling swapped jobs to remain aides to Gordon and Dykes.

Opening Day Lineup

Roster

Player stats

Batting

Starters by position 
Note: Pos = Position; G = Games played; AB = At bats; H = Hits; Avg. = Batting average; HR = Home runs; RBI = Runs batted in

Other batters 
Note: G = Games played; AB = At bats; H = Hits; Avg. = Batting average; HR = Home runs; RBI = Runs batted in

Pitching

Starting pitchers 
Note: G = Games pitched; IP = Innings pitched; W = Wins; L = Losses; ERA = Earned run average; SO = Strikeouts

Other pitchers 
Note: G = Games pitched; IP = Innings pitched; W = Wins; L = Losses; ERA = Earned run average; SO = Strikeouts

Relief pitchers 
Note: G = Games pitched; W = Wins; L = Losses; SV = Saves; ERA = Earned run average; SO = Strikeouts

Farm system 

LEAGUE CHAMPIONS: Toronto

References

External links 
1960 Cleveland Indians season at Baseball Reference

Cleveland Guardians seasons
Cleveland Indians season
Cleveland